Pollo (Spanish and Italian for chicken) may refer to:

Food

Dishes
Arroz con pollo, Spanish and Latin American traditional dish
Pollo adobo, Spanish dish
Parmigiana di pollo, Italian dish
Pollo al disco, Argentine dish
Pollo a la Brasa, Peruvian dish
Pollo alla cacciatore, Italian dish
Pollo motuleño, Mexican dish
Caldo de pollo, Latin American dish
Tinga de pollo, Mexican dish
Aguadito de pollo, Peruvian dish
Pollo al mattone, Italian dish
Pollo Asado, Spanish for "roasted chicken" dish

Restaurants
El Pollo Loco, Mexican-based fast food restaurant chain
Pollo Tropical, American-based Caribbean restaurant chain
Pollo Campero, Guatemalan-based fast food chain
Los Pollos Hermanos, fast food restaurant originally from Breaking Bad universe
Juan Pollo, American-based Mexican restaurant chain
Pollo Brujo, Guatemalan-based fast food chain
Pollo Palenque, American-based Mexican restaurant chain

Other
Pollotarian, semi-vegetarian diet allowing the consumption of chicken and eggs

People
Secondo Pollo (1908-1941), Italian priest
Stefanaq Pollo (1924-1977), Albanian academic
Genc Pollo (born 1963), Albanian politician
Pollo (footballer) (born 1983), Spanish footballer 
Pollo Del Mar, American drag queen
Pollo (band), Brazilian rap group

Places
Pollos, municipality in Spain
Los Pollos, town in Panama
Porto Pollo, neighborhood in Italy
Punta del Pollo, mountain in Spain

See also
List of chicken restaurants
List of chicken dishes